Art Center may refer to:
Arts centre, a type of community centre that focuses on the arts
Art Center College of Design, a college in Pasadena, California